The Earl of Essex is a 1922 German silent historical film directed by Peter Paul Felner and starring Eugen Klöpfer, Fritz Kortner and Werner Krauss. It was loosely based on the 1761 play Der Graf von Essex by Peter von Stüven set in Elizabethan England and based in turn on the 1678 work Le Comte d'Essex by Thomas Corneille.

Cast
 Eugen Klöpfer - Earl of Essex
 Fritz Kortner - Lord Nottingham
 Werner Krauss
 Friedrich Kühne - Cecil
 Eva May - Lady Rutland
 Erna Morena - Lady Nottingham
 Charles Puffy - Cuff
 Magnus Stifter - Lord Southampton
 Agnes Straub  - Queen Elisabeth I
 Rosa Valetti
 Ferdinand von Alten - Raleigh

Bibliography
 Bergfelder, Tim & Bock, Hans-Michael. ''The Concise Cinegraph: Encyclopedia of German. Berghahn Books, 2009.

External links

1922 films
1920s historical films
Films of the Weimar Republic
German historical films
German silent feature films
Films directed by Peter Paul Felner
Films set in England
Films set in London
German films based on plays
Films set in the 16th century
National Film films
German black-and-white films
1920s German films